Mildred Kobrin Gordon (1920 – 23 August 1993) was an American cell biologist, born in Manhattan, noted for her research  of human sperm and the endometrium, and of the uterus.
Gordon graduated from City College with B.S. in biology. She received an M.S. in zoology from Tulane University and her Ph.D. in anatomy from Yale University School of Medicine.

Professional life 
After graduating, Gordon taught and researched at Yale. In the 70's, she became an associate professor of anatomy at State University of New York.   From 1981 until her death on August 23, 1993, Gordon was a professorial lecturer of biology and anatomy at Mount Sinai School of Medicine in New York. She was a professor at School of Biomedical Education of City University Medical School for the last 13 years of her working life. Her work assisted in the development of in vitro fertilization (IVF). She also receives credit for what is known about how calcium influences the spermocyte.

Works
 
 
 
 
 
Gordon, Mildred; Kohorn, Ernest I.; Rice, Susan I.; Hemperly, Susan (February 1972). "The relation of the structure of progestational steroids to nuclear differentiation in human endometrium". The Journal of Clinical Endocrinology and Metabolism. 34 (2): 257–264. doi:10.1210/jcem-34-2-257.

References 

1920 births
1993 deaths
American microbiologists
Women microbiologists
20th-century American women scientists
20th-century American scientists
Tulane University alumni
Yale School of Medicine alumni